Parcona District is one of fourteen districts of the province Ica in Peru.  Parcona is the second smallest of the fourteen districts.  

Parcona is an inland small area, 2.5 km from the Ica District and inhabits 8,000 people.

References

1962 establishments in Peru
States and territories established in 1962